Siamsa Tíre (meaning  "entertainment of the land") is home to Ireland's National Folk Theatre and is located in Tralee Town Park, Tralee, County Kerry, Ireland.

Name and activities
Siamsa, pronounced "Shee-am-sa", comes from the Irish language. The word itself expresses mirth and music, Tíre means 'of the land'. At the heart of Siamsa Tíre lies a professional repertory company group drawn from the local community but trained in the unique Siamsa style and idiom over a period of ten years. Full-time and community performers integrate and blend into a dedicated and talented team performing a repertoire of productions each summer.

Following the move to its custom built premises in 1991, the company undertook the role of operating an arts centre. Since then, in addition to its remit as the National Folk Theatre, Siamsa Tíre also hosts a number of events throughout the year. Contemporary theatre, dance, classical music, comedy and literary events feature on a year-round programme, as well as a visual programme in a gallery spaces, which also explore the themes of folk culture. Siamsa Tíre also hosts residencies by professional artists and regularly tours the work of the National Folk Theatre.

In recent years, Siamsa Tíre has become involved in exploring "new ways of interpreting folk culture, including a number of multidisciplinary projects incorporating contemporary dance, visual arts and site specific work".

History
The origins of Siamsa Tire date to 1957 when a priest, Fr Pat Ahern, was sent to Kerry to establish a choir in St John's church in Tralee. A passion play, entitled "Golgotha", was later staged in 1963. The performing group, which developed from these initiatives, called themselves "Siamsóirí na Ríochta". Siamsóirí na Ríochta performed in a number of venues around Ireland (including the Abbey Theatre) and were invited to perform on a number of Raidio Telefís Éireann productions. In the late 1960s, the group staged a season of productions during the summer, becoming Siamsa Tíre's first Summer Season.

A company, Siamsa Tíre Teo, was formed in 1974 and Pat Ahern was appointed artistic director, a position he held until 1998. Other key people, associated with Siamsa Tíre, included Martin Whelan. Whelan, who was initially involved in a voluntary capacity, later took on a more full-time role in the organisation. In 1974, he was appointed manager of Siamsa Tíre, a position he retained until his death in 2002.

Whelan, along with Ahern and the architect, Patrick O’Sullivan were instrumental in the building of the current theatre and arts centre in Tralee, travelling as far afield as the United States to study other arts facilities. The theatre and arts centre was officially opened in 1991. Prior to this, Siamsa Tíre had a number of temporary homes, including the Ashe Memorial Hall and the old Theatre Royal in Tralee.

External links 
 Siamsa Tíre website

1974 establishments in Ireland
Buildings and structures in County Kerry
Theatres in the Republic of Ireland
Tourist attractions in County Kerry
Tralee